The Eliteserien referees is a group of professional or semi-professional football referees and  assistant referees, appointed by Dommerkomitéen, the Norwegian referees' committee.

Eliteserien Match Officials
The 2021 Eliteserien match officials lists, consists of 14 referees and 24 assistant referees.

Referees

 Sivert Amland
 Usman Aslam
 Espen Eskås
 Marius Hansen Grøtta
 Dag Vidar Hafsås
 Tom Harald Hagen
 Kristoffer Hagenes
 Tore Hansen
 Sigurd Kringstad
 Svein Oddvar Moen
 Ola Hobber Nilsen
 Rohit Saggi
 Tommy Skjerven
 Kai Erik Steen

Eskås, Hagenes, Hansen, Kringstad, Moen, Saggi and Steen are also FIFA International Referees.

Hafsås, Hagen, Nilsen and Skjerven were all previously FIFA International Referees.

Assistant Referees

 Ivar Askeland
 Isaak Bashevkin
 Sondre Dahle
 Anders Olav Dale
 Jim Dyb
 Jan Erik Engan
 Tom Harald Grønevik
 Kristoffer Gullhav
 Kim Tomas Haglund
 Eivin Hansen
 Ole Haukåsen
 Geir Oskar Isaksen
 Ivar M. Jahr
 Morten Jensen
 Kim Andre Johnsen
 Christer Jørgensen
 Jon-Michael Knutsen
 Runar Langseth
 Magnus Lundberg
 Dag Roger Nebben
 Alf Olav Rossland
 Jørgen Valstadsve
 Anders Velo
 Øystein Ytterland

Bashevkin, Dale, Engan, Grønevik, Haglund, Isaksen, Jensen, Knutsen, Langseth and Ytterland are also FIFA International Assistant Referees.

Johnsen, Lundberg and Nebben were all previously FIFA International Assistant Referees.

Notable International Appointments
Current and former Eliteserien match officials have overseen some of the most prestigious matches available, these include:
 2006 UEFA Champions League Final
Refereed by Terje Hauge, and assisted by Steinar Holvik and Arild Sundet.
 2008–09 UEFA Champions League Semi-final second leg (Chelsea v. Barcelona)
Refereed by Tom Henning Øvrebø, and assisted by Geir Åge Holen and Dag Roger Nebben.
 2011 FIFA U-17 World Cup Final
Refereed by Svein Oddvar Moen and assisted by Kim Tomas Haglund and Erwin Zeinstra (Netherlands).

Notable former Eliteserien Referees

References

External links
Toppdommerforeningen
Referees committee

Football refereeing in Norway
Referees